Fairview Manor also known as Longue Vue Manor, Our Lady of Fairview, and Fairview Manor Restaurant and Lodge, is a historic home located at Clayton in Jefferson County, New York. It was built in 1937 as a summer retreat for Carl Zimmerman.  It is a very interesting and intact interpretation of a European castle/Manor house with a distinctive eclectic French flavor.

It was listed on the National Register of Historic Places in 2007.

As of April 2011, the property was permanently closed, and had been for quite some time, due to the overgrown nature of the surroundings.  The property includes approximately 16 acres, several out buildings, guest cabins, a chapel, and a river front location.

In July 2014, current owners purchased 7.6 acres, after the property was subdivided, including the French Eclectic Manor, the chapel, cottages near the manor, and of course the St. Lawrence River view! The property had  fallen into disrepair after nearly 8 years of vacancy. The original slate roof was harvested and replaced with a composite slate roof, the original slate will be repurposed as cheese boards, coasters, etc. All the windows were replaced by Marvin Windows, replicating their original style. A new geothermal heating and cooling system was installed. Interior and Exterior renovations were complete to preserve the history.

References

External links

French Castle 1000 Islands.Terraced above St. Lawrence River/Seaway

Houses on the National Register of Historic Places in New York (state)
Houses completed in 1937
Houses in Jefferson County, New York
National Register of Historic Places in Jefferson County, New York